Green Island is an island in Green Bay and part of the Town of Peshtigo, in Marinette County, Wisconsin. The Green Island Light is on the island.

Gallery

Diagram

Climate

Notes 

Landforms of Marinette County, Wisconsin
Lake islands of Wisconsin
Islands of Lake Michigan in Wisconsin